Wyndham Richard Bates (1829–1889) was a United States Navy sailor and a recipient of the United States military's highest decoration, the Medal of Honor.

A native of Wales, Bates immigrated to the U.S. and joined the Navy from the state of New York. For this action, he and his shipmates, Captain of the Afterguard John Brown and Seaman Thomas Burke, were awarded the Medal of Honor three months later, on August 1.

Bates' official Medal of Honor citation reads:
For heroic conduct in rescuing from drowning James Rose and John Russell, seamen of the U.S.S. Winooski, off Eastport, Maine, 10 May 1866.

See also
List of Medal of Honor recipients in non-combat incidents

References

External links

1829 births
1889 deaths
Welsh emigrants to the United States
United States Navy sailors
United States Navy Medal of Honor recipients
Welsh-born Medal of Honor recipients
Non-combat recipients of the Medal of Honor